The 1981 NCAA Skiing Championships were contested at the Park City Mountain Resort in Park City, Utah as part of the 28th annual NCAA-sanctioned ski tournament to determine the individual and team national champions of men's collegiate slalom skiing, and cross-country skiing in the United States.

Utah, coached by Pat Miller, claimed their first team national championship, finishing 11 points ahead of  defending champions Vermont in the cumulative team standings.

Events
One event was added to the program this year:
 Men's crossing country relay

Venue

This year's NCAA skiing championships were held at the Park City Mountain Resort in Park City, Utah. 

These were the third championships held in the state of Utah (1957 and 1963).

Team scoring

See also
List of NCAA skiing programs

References

1981 in Utah
NCAA Skiing Championships
NCAA Skiing Championships
1981 in alpine skiing
1981 in cross-country skiing